William Samuel Stevens (born August 27, 1945) is a former quarterback in the National Football League. Stevens was drafted by the Green Bay Packers in the third round of the 1968 NFL Draft. He played two seasons with the team. He was later acquired by the Chicago Bears, but did not appear in a game for them.

During his college football career at Texas Western College (now The University of Texas at El Paso) he became the second player (after Charley Johnson) to be named Most Valuable Player of the Sun Bowl twice, winning the award in 1965 and 1967. He was a two-time All-American, and was the NCAA’s all-time passing yardage leader at the conclusion of his senior season.

Stevens received a Bachelor of Science degree in Education from UTEP in 1968. After his playing days, he returned to El Paso and worked as a teacher, coach, and finally in banking.

References

: 

Sportspeople from Galveston, Texas
Players of American football from Texas
Green Bay Packers players
American football quarterbacks
UTEP Miners football players
1945 births
Living people